Augustine Otu (born 8 April 1998) is a Liberian professional footballer who plays as a striker for Tersana SC.

References

1998 births
Living people
Liberian footballers
LPRC Oilers players
Liberian expatriate footballers
Liberia international footballers
Association football forwards
Place of birth missing (living people)